Abdullah Al-Barghash was a former member of the Kuwaiti National Assembly from the fifth district. Born in 1962, Al-Barghash studied Customs Affairs and worked in the Customs Department before being elected to the National Assembly in 2008.  While political parties are technically illegal in Kuwait, Al-Barghash affiliates with the Islamist and Salafi deputies.  He is a member of the Ajman tribe.

References

Members of the National Assembly (Kuwait)
Living people
1962 births